The NHK Hall is a concert hall located at the NHK Broadcasting Center, the main headquarters of Japan's public broadcaster NHK. The hall is the main venue for the NHK Symphony Orchestra, but it has also played host to other events, such as the 1979 Japan Music Awards, and NHK's annual New Year's Eve special Kōhaku Uta Gassen.

History
The original NHK Hall opened in 1955 at a location in Tokyo's Uchisaiwai-cho district. Several live programs were broadcast from the hall, such as Song Plaza, Kōhaku Uta Gassen, and Personal Secrets. In 1973, a new NHK Hall was established in Shibuya, Tokyo at the site of NHK's new headquarters, the NHK Broadcasting Center.

The acoustics for the hall were designed by Minoru Nagata, later of Nagata Acoustics, while TOA Corporation provided the hall's sound equipment.

On April 9, 2019, it announced that it will be closed for a long period from March 2021 to June 2022 due to seismic retrofitting construction, renovation & reopening. The 72nd NHK Kouhaku Utagassen, scheduled to be broadcast on December 31, 2021, will be held at the Tokyo International Forum. It will be held at venues other than NHK Hall for the first time in 49 years since the 23rd, and for the first time since the hall started operation.

See also 
NHK Osaka Hall

References

External links 

  

Music venues in Tokyo
Theatres in Tokyo
Concert halls in Japan
Hall
Music venues completed in 1973
Buildings and structures in Shibuya
1973 establishments in Japan